Sibirtsevo is an urban locality (an urban-type settlement) in Chernigovsky District of Primorsky Krai, Russia. Population:

History
It was originally named Manzovka and was renamed after Vsevolod Sibirtsev, Sergey Lazo's companion in arms, in 1972.

Transportation
Sibirtsevo is a large railway station on the Trans-Siberian Railway.

References

Urban-type settlements in Primorsky Krai